Legionella quateirensis is a Gram-negative bacterium from the genus Legionella which was isolated from a shower in a hotel bathroom in Quarteira, Portugal.

References

External links
Type strain of Legionella quateirensis at BacDive -  the Bacterial Diversity Metadatabase

Legionellales
Bacteria described in 1993